Philip Wollen OAM (born 1950) is an Australian philanthropist, environmentalist and animal rights activist. He is a former Vice-President of Citibank and was also General Manager at Citicorp. Wollen is a vegan and funds projects that protect children, animals and the environment. At age 34, Australian Business Magazine named him in the "Brightest and Best" top 40 headhunted executives in Australia. In 2005 he received the Medal of the Order of Australia and in 2007 he won the Australian of the Year (Victoria) award. 
Wollen went to school at the Bishop Cotton Boys' School, Bangalore. He delivered the General Thimayya Memorial Lecture in Bangalore, India in 2008. He lives with his wife Trix in Melbourne, Victoria.

Winsome Constance Kindness 
Wollen's main project, Winsome Constance Kindness, is a global initiative whose mission statement is "to promote kindness towards all other living beings and enshrine it as a recognisable trait in the Australian character and culture". The initiative emphasises ethics, compassion and co-operation, and opposes cruelty to humans and non-human animals.  In 2020 it had initiatives in 40 countries.

Wollen awards the annual Kindness Gold Medal and $20,000 cash prize to people who have devoted their lives in the service of others. Past recipients include David Attenborough, UK; Jane Goodall, UK; Maneka Gandhi, India; Paul Watson, USA; Andrew Linzey, UK; Jill Robinson, China; Christine Townend, Australia; T. Colin Campbell, USA; Peter Hammarstedt, Sweden; Pradeep Nath, India; Christopher DeRose, USA; Damien Mander, Zimbabwe; and Chinny Krishna, India.

Kindness House
"Kindness House" - an "incubator" for growing NGOs - provides free use of heavily subsidized serviced office facilities to activist groups. It is located in the Melbourne suburb of Fitzroy.

References

External links

 Kindness Trust on Facebook
 Kindness House
 Winsome Constance Kindness Trust
 Australia Day Awards 2005

1950 births
Australian animal rights activists
Australian philanthropists
Australian veganism activists
Bishop Cotton Boys' School alumni
Living people
Recipients of the Medal of the Order of Australia